The 2000 Calder Cup playoffs of the American Hockey League began on April 11, 2000. The sixteen teams that qualified, eight from each conference, played best-of-five series for division semifinals and best-of-seven series for division finals and conference finals.  The conference champions played a best-of-seven series for the Calder Cup. The Calder Cup Final ended on June 4, 2000 with the Hartford Wolf Pack defeating the Rochester Americans four games to two to win the first Calder Cup in team history.

Hartford's Derek Armstrong won the Jack A. Butterfield Trophy as AHL playoff MVP. Rochester's Mika Noronen set an AHL playoff record by posting 6 shutouts during the playoffs while teammate Domenic Pittis tied the AHL record for assists in a single playoff with 26. In winning their first five home games of the 2000 Calder Cup Playoffs, the Providence Bruins set an AHL playoff record by winning 16 consecutive playoff home games, a streak that included 10 consecutive home wins from the 1999 Calder Cup Playoffs and a win from the 1997 Calder Cup Playoffs.

Playoff seeds
After the 1999–2000 AHL regular season, 16 teams qualified for the playoffs. The top four teams from each division qualified for the playoffs. However, due to the uneven number of teams in the Eastern Conference, it was possible for the fifth-placed team in the New England Division to crossover to the Atlantic Division. This could only happen if the fifth-placed team in the New England Division earned more points than the fourth-placed team in the Atlantic Division. In this case, the fifth-placed team from the New England Division would play in place of the fourth-placed team from the Atlantic Division in that part of the playoff bracket. The Hartford Wolf Pack were the Eastern Conference regular season champions as well as the Macgregor Kilpatrick Trophy winners with the best overall regular season record. The Rochester Americans were the Western Conference regular season champions.

Eastern Conference

Atlantic Division
Quebec Citadelles – 83 points
Saint John Flames – 80 points
Lowell Lock Monsters – 77 points

New England Division
Hartford Wolf Pack – Eastern Conference regular season champions; Macgregor Kilpatrick Trophy winners, 107 points
Portland Pirates – 103 points
Worcester IceCats – 83 points
Springfield Falcons – 78 points
Providence Bruins – 75 points (Played in the Atlantic Division bracket by virtue of earning more points than the fourth-placed team in that division)

Western Conference

Empire Division
Rochester Americans – Western Conference regular season champions, 104 points
Syracuse Crunch – 80 points
Hamilton Bulldogs – 73 points
Albany River Rats – 70 points

Mid-Atlantic Division
Kentucky Thoroughblades – 97 points
Hershey Bears – 94 points
Philadelphia Phantoms – 93 points
Louisville Panthers – 92 points

Bracket

In each round the team that earned more points during the regular season receives home ice advantage, meaning they receive the "extra" game on home-ice if the series reaches the maximum number of games. There is no set series format due to arena scheduling conflicts and travel considerations.

Division Semifinals
Note 1: All times are in Eastern Time (UTC−4).
Note 2: Game times in italics signify games to be played only if necessary.
Note 3: Home team is listed first.

Eastern Conference

Atlantic Division

(A1) Quebec Citadelles vs. (N5) Providence Bruins

(A2) Saint John Flames vs. (A3) Lowell Lock Monsters

New England Division

(N1) Hartford Wolf Pack vs. (N4) Springfield Falcons

(N2) Portland Pirates vs. (N3) Worcester IceCats

Western Conference

Empire Division

(E1) Rochester Americans vs. (E4) Albany River Rats

(E2) Syracuse Crunch vs. (E3) Hamilton Bulldogs

Mid-Atlantic Division

(M1) Kentucky Thoroughblades vs. (M4) Louisville Panthers

(M2) Hershey Bears vs. (M3) Philadelphia Phantoms

Division Finals

Eastern Conference

Atlantic Division

(A3) Lowell Lock Monsters vs. (N5) Providence Bruins

New England Division

(N1) Hartford Wolf Pack vs. (N3) Worcester IceCats

Western Conference

Empire Division

(E1) Rochester Americans vs. (E3) Hamilton Bulldogs

Mid-Atlantic Division

(M1) Kentucky Thoroughblades vs. (M2) Hershey Bears

Conference finals

Eastern Conference

(N1) Hartford Wolf Pack vs. (N5) Providence Bruins

Western Conference

(E1) Rochester Americans vs. (M2) Hershey Bears

Calder Cup Final

(N1) Hartford Wolf Pack vs. (E1) Rochester Americans

See also
1999–2000 AHL season
List of AHL seasons

References

Calder Cup
Calder Cup playoffs